Belize Rural North is an electoral constituency in the Belize District represented in the House of Representatives of the National Assembly of Belize since 2020 by Marconi Leal of the People's United Party.

Profile

The Belize Rural North constituency was created for the 1961 general election as part of a major nationwide redistricting. Out of the 13 Belize District constituencies it is one of three located outside the Belize City limits, consisting of the northern half of the Belize District mainland. Altun Ha, a major Mayan ruin, is located in the constituency.

Area Representatives

Elections

References

British Honduras Legislative Assembly constituencies established in 1961
Political divisions in Belize
Belize Rural North
1961 establishments in British Honduras